The Anglesea Arms, South Kensington is a pub at 15 Selwood Terrace, South Kensington, London SW7.

It is a Grade II listed building, built in the early-mid 19th century.

References

External links
 
 

Grade II listed pubs in London
Grade II listed buildings in the Royal Borough of Kensington and Chelsea
Pubs in the Royal Borough of Kensington and Chelsea